EDDP may refer to:

 EDDP, the International Civil Aviation Organization airport code for Leipzig/Halle Airport
 2-Ethylidene-1,5-dimethyl-3,3-diphenylpyrrolidine, a metabolite of methadone
 Edifenphos (O-ethyl-S,S-diphenyldithiophosphate), a pesticide